Robert Austen (3 August 1642 – 22 August 1696) was an English politician who sat in the House of Commons in two periods between 1666 and 1696.

Austen was the son of Sir Robert Austen, 1st Baronet and his second wife. He was educated at Gray's Inn and was a colonel in the militia.

Austen was elected Member of Parliament for Winchelsea on 4 October 1666 and held the seat until 1681. In 1668 he was deputy mayor of Winchelsea and speaker of the Cinque Ports at the Guestling court.

Austen regained his seat at Winchelsea on 17 January 1689 and held it until his death aged 54 in 1696. He was Lord of the Admiralty and Commissioner for public accounts from 1691 and a Commissioner for Greenwich Hospital from 1695.

Austen married Judith Freke, daughter of Ralph Freke of Hannington Wiltshire in September 1669.

References

 

1642 births
1696 deaths
Lords of the Admiralty
People from Winchelsea
English MPs 1661–1679
English MPs 1679
English MPs 1680–1681
English MPs 1689–1690
English MPs 1690–1695
English MPs 1695–1698
Civil servants in the Audit Office (United Kingdom)